The China Railways JF13 (解放13, Jiěfàng, "liberation") class steam locomotive was a class of 2-8-2 steam locomotives operated by the China Railway, built by the Škoda Works in Czechoslovakia in 1939.

These locomotives were originally built for the North China Transportation Company, which had been formed in 1938 to operate railways in the collaborationist Provisional Government of the Republic of China during the Japanese occupation of China. A total of 45 were delivered to NCTC, which designated them Mikaha (ミカハ) class. 

After the end of the Pacific War, these locomotives were passed on to the Republic of China Railway. After the establishment of the People's Republic of China, China Railways designated them ㄇㄎ13 (MK13) class in 1951, and subsequently 解放13 (JF13) class in 1959. The last of these locomotives known to be operational were JF13 3859, observed working at the Changxindian Crane Works in Beijing in 1981, and JF13 3876 at the Hegang Mining Railway in Heilongjiang province, where it was last seen in 1986.

See also
List of locomotives in China
China Railways JF3: in common with JF13 of manufacturer.

References

2-8-2 locomotives
Škoda locomotives
Railway locomotives introduced in 1939
Steam locomotives of China
Standard gauge locomotives of China
Freight locomotives